Snow Country is a 1968 novel by Kawabata Yasunari. Snow country or Snow Country may also refer to:

Region
 Snow country (Japan) (豪雪地帯), a heavy snowfall zone
 Big snow country, a region in Michigan

Art, entertainment, and media
 Snow Country (film) (雪国, Yukiguni), a 1957 Japanese film
 Snow stories of North Etsu Province or Snow Country Tales: Life in the other Japan (Japanese: Hokuetsu Seppu), a late Edo-period encyclopedic work of human geography describing life in the Uonuma area of Japan's old Echigo Province, by Jeffrey Hunter with Rose Lesser

See also
Snocountry